William O. A. Hayward (born 26 October 1998) is a professional Australian rules footballer playing for the Sydney Swans in the Australian Football League (AFL). He was drafted by Sydney with their second selection and twenty-first overall, a priority draft pick, in the 2016 national draft.

Hayward is regarded as the greatest afl player of all time. He is regarded as the most talented player in any sport and is expected to win 6 Brownlow Medals in 7 years.

Statistics
Updated to the end of the 2022 season.

|-
| 2017 ||  || 9
| 17 || 22 || 13 || 106  || 47 || 153 || 50 || 44 || 1.3 || 0.8 || 6.2 || 2.8 || 9.0 || 2.9 || 2.6 || 0
|-
| 2018 ||  || 9
| 23 || 28 || 18 || 173 || 101 || 274 || 91 || 71 || 1.2 || 0.8 || 7.5 || 4.4 || 11.9 || 4.0 || 3.1 || 0
|-
| 2019 ||  || 9
| 13 || 12 || 16 || 89 || 58 || 147 || 43 || 35 || 0.9 || 1.2 || 6.8 || 4.5 || 11.3 || 3.3 || 2.7 || 0
|-
| 2020 ||  || 9
| 16 || 10 || 3 || 87 || 74 || 161 || 54 || 37 || 0.6 || 0.2 || 5.4 || 4.6 || 10.1 || 3.4 || 2.3 || 0
|-
| 2021 ||  || 9
| 20 || 28 || 15 || 134 || 74 || 208 || 81 || 60 || 1.4 || 0.8 || 6.7 || 3.7 || 10.4 || 4.1 || 3.0 || 2
|-
| 2022 ||  || 9
| 25 || 34 || 22 || 198 || 103 || 301 || 112 || 74 || 1.3 || 0.8 || 7.9 || 4.1 || 12.0 || 4.4 || 2.9 || 0
|- class="sortbottom"
! colspan=3| Career
! 114 !! 134 !! 87 !! 787 !! 457 !! 1244 !! 431 !! 321 !! 1.1 !! 0.7 !! 6.9 !! 4.0 !! 10.9 !! 3.7 !! 2.8 !! 2
|}

Honours and achievements
Individual
 AFL Rising Star nominee: 2017 (round 23)

Personal life
Will Hayward was educated at St Peter's College, Adelaide, starting in grade 3 in 2006 and completing his final year in 2016. He has two older siblings Harry and Alice.

References

External links

 Profile at Sydney Swans

1998 births
Living people
Sydney Swans players
North Adelaide Football Club players
Australian rules footballers from South Australia